Jodoigne is a city and municipality of Wallonia located in the province of Walloon Brabant, Belgium.

On January 1, 2006, Jodoigne had a total population of 12,440.

The municipality consists of the following districts: Dongelberg, Jauchelette, Jodoigne,  Jodoigne-Souveraine, Lathuy, Piétrain, Saint-Jean-Geest (including the hamlet of Sainte-Marie-Geest), Saint-Remy-Geest, and Zétrud-Lumay.

In the 1568 Battle of Jodoigne, one of the early battles of the Eighty Years' War, the Spanish Duke of Alba defeated a Dutch rebel force under William the Silent.

The previous mayor of Jodoigne, Louis Michel, a liberal politician was the Belgian foreign minister from 1999 until 2004 and was the Belgian European commissioner from 2004 until 2009. The current mayor is Jean-Paul Wahl.

The asteroid 1199 Geldonia was named in its honour (from the Latin form of the name) by Eugène Delporte.

References

External links
 
Jodoigne official web site 

 
Cities in Wallonia
Municipalities of Walloon Brabant